The M.A. Chidambaram Stadium, also known as Chepauk is a cricket ground in Chennai, India. Formerly known as the Madras Cricket Club Ground it now has a capacity of 50,000. The ground has hosted 34 Test matches, the first of these was played in 1934 between India and England.  The ground has also staged 22 One Day Internationals (ODIs), the first was played between India and Australia in 1987.

The first Test century scored at the ground was by the Englishman Cyril Walters. Walters's innings of 102 was scored against India in 1934. The Indian Virender Sehwag holds the record for the highest score at the ground, 319 from 304 balls, which was made in 2008 against South Africa. This was Sehwag's second triple century, the only other Test players that have scored 2 triple centuries are Donald Bradman and Brian Lara. The record for the highest score by an overseas player belongs to England's Joe Root who made 218 in 2021. Sachin Tendulkar is the only player to have scored 5 Test centuries at the ground. A century in each innings of a match has been achieved twice at the M.A. Chidambaram Stadium. The Sri Lankan Duleep Mendis made 2 innings of 105 against India in 1982 and the Englishman Andrew Strauss scored 123 and 108 in 2008, also against India. Mahendra Singh Dhoni scored 224 in the 1st test against Australia in the home series on 24 February 2013. He is the first Indian Wicket-Keeper Batsman to score a Double Century in Test Cricket and 7th Wicket-Keeper in Test Cricket to do so.

14 ODI centuries have been made at the M.A. Chidambaram Stadium. The first of these was scored by the Australian Geoff Marsh who made 110 in 1987. The Pakistani Saeed Anwar holds the record for the highest ODI scored at the ground with 194, from 146 deliveries against India in 1997. Anwars innings was, at the time, a world record having beating the previous best of 189 not out by Viv Richards. Anwar's record stood until August 2009 when it was equalled by the Zimbabwean Charles Coventry. The highest score by an Indian batsman at the M.A. Chidambaram Stadium is 139 not out which was made by MS Dhoni in 2007. At the time Dhoni was playing for an Asian XI against an African XI.
 The highest score by an Indian batsman representing India at this stadium is 138 which was made by Virat Kohli against South Africa on 22 October 2015.

Key
 * denotes that the batsman was not out.
 Inns. denotes the number of the innings in the match.
 Balls denotes the number of balls faced in an innings.
 NR denotes that the number of balls was not recorded.
 Parentheses next to the player's score denotes his century number at the M.A. Chidambaram Stadium.
 The column title Date refers to the date the match started.
 The column title Result refers to whether the player's team won, lost or if the match was drawn or tied.

Test centuries

The following table summarises the Test centuries scored at the M.A. Chidambaram Stadium.

One Day International centuries

The following table summarises the One Day International centuries scored at the M.A. Chidambaram Stadium.

Women's ODI

References 

M. A. Chid
Centuries